Natalia Castrén (1830–1881) was a Finnish culture personality and salon hostess. She belonged to Johan Ludvig Runeberg's social circle and was an important member of the contemporary cultural circles in Finland.

References

1830 births
1881 deaths
19th-century Finnish people